= Dzhabar =

- Location within Azerbaijan
- Coordinates: 40°26′36″N 50°16′26″E
- Country: Azerbaijan
- City: Baku
- Time zone: UTC+4 (AZT)
  - Summer (DST): UTC+5 (AZT)

Dzhabar (also, Dzhaban) is a village in Baku, Azerbaijan.
